Mozambique was represented at the 2006 Commonwealth Games in Melbourne.

Medals

Gold

Silver

Bronze
 Maria de Lurdes Mutola, Athletics, Women's 800m

Sport in Mozambique
Mozambique at the Commonwealth Games
Nations at the 2006 Commonwealth Games
Commonwealth Games